Two ships of the Royal Australian Navy (RAN) have been named HMAS Gladstone, for the port city of Gladstone, Queensland:

, a Bathurst-class corvette commissioned in 1943 and paid off in 1956
, Fremantle-class patrol boat commissioned in 1984 and decommissioned in 2007

Battle honours
Ships named HMAS Gladstone are entitled to carry two battle honours:
 Pacific 1943–45
 New Guinea 1943–44

References

Royal Australian Navy ship names